Xavier University of Louisiana (also known as XULA) is a private, historically black, Catholic university in New Orleans, Louisiana. It is the only Catholic HBCU and, upon the canonization of Katharine Drexel in 2000, became the first Catholic university founded by a saint.

History

Background 
Katharine Drexel, a Catholic nun possessing a substantial inheritance from her father, banker-financier Francis Drexel, founded and staffed many institutions throughout the United States in the 19th and 20th centuries, in an effort to help educate and evangelize Native Americans and African Americans. Many of her chosen staff included sisters of the Sisters of the Blessed Sacrament, the religious order she founded and served in as the first Superior General.

Aware of the lack of Catholic education for young black people in the South during Jim Crow, she planned to establish a high school in New Orleans. The chosen site had been previously occupied by Southern University on Magazine Street, a black institution which had moved to Baton Rouge after an influx of white neighbors petitioned for its relocation.

Drexel sent the Josephite priest Pierre Oscar LeBeau to survey the property, to avoid public scrutiny and controversy, as her reputation for establishing black schools was well known. On April 13, 1915, Harry McEnerny, serving as Drexel's agent, purchased the property for US$18,000. She knew that the city and community would never approve a sale for a black institution, but by going through an agent, the sale was allowed; even so, vandals smashed all the windows after learning of Drexel's intent.

High school era 
The high school opened on 27 September 1915 as Southern University of New Orleans, later re-named after Francis Xavier (the namesake of Katharine's father). In May 1916, it was incorporated under the title, "Sisters of the Blessed Sacrament for Indians and Colored People, of Louisiana," according to the laws of the state, and the new name, "Xavier University", was cut into the stone slab above the main entrance. (The high school, known as Xavier Prep, remained in operation until 2013; today, St. Katharine Drexel Preparatory School operates from the same location.)

In 1917, Xavier expanded to include a normal school to provide training for black teachers, as Archbishop James H. Blenk was eager for graduates to teach at six planned new black parishes. On September 9, 1921, the Louisiana Department of Education officially recognized "Xavier University" as a State Approved High School. By 1922, the school was described as the only Catholic institution in the United States that offered "a full four years' high school course to colored boys." While this may not be true, Xavier University was by far the most prominent Catholic institution offering such educational opportunities at the time.

University founding 
In 1925, Xavier University of Louisiana came into being when the College of Liberal Arts and Sciences was established, with the Josephite priest Edward Brunner as the first president. The Louisiana Department of Education officially recognized Xavier University as a four-year college on March 19, 1928, with the first degrees awarded that spring. The College of Pharmacy was next to be opened, in 1927. Alongside Drexel's sisters, the Josephites served as some of the school's first male teachers, and as chaplains.

Recognizing the university's need for a separate identity and room to expand, Drexel bought a tract of undeveloped land for a campus on the corner of Palmetto and Pine Streets in 1929. To avoid blockage of the deal, Drexel again purchased the property through an agent.

Construction of the U-shaped, Gothic Revival-style Main Building, Convent and Library, made from Indiana limestone and now on the National Register of Historic Places, were completed between 1932 and 1937. The Main Administration Building was dedicated by the Archbishop of Philadelphia, Cardinal Dennis Joseph Dougherty, on Columbus Day, October 12, 1932. The Administration building is a City of New Orleans landmark.

Modern history
In May 1961, a group of Freedom Riders, arrived in New Orleans by plane after bus drivers in Alabama refused to take them to Montgomery, Alabama. Locals, aware of the fire bombings and other attacks against other Freedom Riders, refused to accommodate them with lodging out of fear of retaliatory violence. Norman C. Francis, the university's Dean of Men, secretly arranged for the group to stay several days in a dormitory on campus. He had received permission from University President Sister Mary Josephina to allow the group to occupy space on the third floor of St. Michael's Hall under the condition that the press would not be alerted as to the move.

In 1987, Pope John Paul II addressed the presidents of all U.S. Catholic colleges from the courtyard of the Xavier administration building.

When Hurricane Katrina struck the New Orleans area in October 2005, Xavier, located in the lower-lying Gert Town section and adjacent to the Washington-Palmetto Canal, suffered damage to almost every structure on campus. Many buildings sat partially submerged for extended periods of time following the hurricane. University president Francis organized boats and buses to transport stranded faculty, staff, and students from the campus to safe areas. Students began returning to the university in January 2006.

In April 2006, the nation of Qatar donated $17.5 million to assist the university in hurricane recovery and in expanding the school's College of Pharmacy. The groundbreaking in 2008 was attended by Sheikh Hamad bin Khalifa al-Thani, leader of Qatar, and on 15 October 2010 the school's Qatar Pharmacy Pavilion opened, adding  adjacent to the existing College of Pharmacy building.

Senator Barack Obama gave the commencement speech in August 2006. New Orleans' archbishop, Alfred C. Hughes, declined to attend, citing that Obama was not opposed to abortion, and that he had not been consulted prior to the event. Obama returned after becoming president, visiting New Orleans in August 2010 to commemorate the fifth anniversary of Hurricane Katrina. He gave an address at Xavier complimenting the work of the leaders of the community and affirming the commitment to continue to aid in the rebuilding of the area.

The university received the "Katrina Compassion Award" from the United States government Corporation for National and Community Service in 2006, for the efforts of an estimated 60% of its students in rebuilding the neighborhoods damaged by the hurricane.

Xavier's campus was evacuated during Hurricane Ida in August 2021, 16 years to the day after Hurricane Katrina. Students who remained on campus were later evacuated to Dallas. The school resumed operations as normal on September 13

Philanthropy 
In July 2020, Xavier received $20 million from philanthropist MacKenzie Scott, the largest single gift in the university's history.

Demographics

Students 
Though Xavier is the nation's only historically Black and Catholic university, its doors have always been open to qualified students of any race or creed.

In Fall 2020, the vast majority of the student body was Black or African American (approx. 75.1%), and 12% identified as Catholic. Xavier was also the first Catholic college to educate both men and women. Almost half of Xavier's students (43.8%) in the fall of 2020 were from Louisiana. Non-local enrollment continues to increase, with students coming in from at least 40 other states and sixteen foreign countries.

Student life is enriched by the social and cultural setting of New Orleans and by campus activities designed to enhance personal growth, interpersonal skills, and leadership in such areas as community service, the environment, cultural concerns, and social justice.

Faculty 
As of fall 2020, Xavier had a full-time faculty of 236 educators, both religious and lay, of diverse ethnic and racial origins—95 percent of whom have terminal degrees—providing a comfortable student/faculty ratio of 12.5/1.

Forty-four faculty members serve as endowed chairs or professors, which provides additional financial support for their research and teaching.

Unique among HBCUs, Xavier has a higher percentage of non-Black faculty than Black as of 2022.

Administration

Presidents 

 Father Edward J. Brunner SSJ (1915-1932)
 Mother M. Agatha Ryan, SBS (1932-1955)
 Sister Josephina Kenney, SBS (1955-1965)
 Sister M. Maris Stella Ross, SBS (1965-1968)
 Dr. Norman C. Francis (1968-2015)
 C. Reynold Verret (2015–present)

Academics

College of Arts and Sciences

Academic divisions
Biological and Public Health Sciences
Business
Education and Counseling
Fine Arts and Humanities
Mathematical and Physical Sciences
Philosophy
Social and Behavioral Sciences
Theology

College of Pharmacy

Academic divisions
Division of Basic Pharmaceutical Sciences
Division of Clinical and Administrative Sciences

Pre-Med and biological science programs

More African-American alumni of Xavier consistently place into medical school and graduate with baccalaureate degrees in the physical sciences and biological sciences than African-American alumni of any other college or university in the United States. Xavier's College of Pharmacy is one of just two pharmacy schools in Louisiana. Xavier consistently ranks among the top three colleges in the nation in graduating African Americans with Pharm.D. degrees.

Dual degree engineering program
Xavier does not offer engineering degrees but belongs to partnerships with several engineering institutions that automatically admit qualified Xavier science students interested in pursuing a bachelor's in an engineering discipline. Students who successfully complete the program will receive a bachelor's degree from Xavier and the chosen engineering institution in approximately five years. Engineering institutions in partnership with Xavier are Tulane University, University of New Orleans, Southern University at Baton Rouge, Louisiana State University, University of Notre Dame, North Carolina Agricultural and Technical State University, University of Detroit Mercy, Georgia Institute of Technology, and University of Wisconsin at Madison.

Institute for Black Catholic Studies 
In 1979, the Institute for Black Catholic Studies was founded at XULA by Fr Thaddeus Posey, OFM Cap, with the help of Frs Augustus Taylor; David Benz; Joseph Nearon, SSS; and Sr Jamie Phelps, OP. Every summer since, IBCS has hosted a variety of accredited courses on Black Catholic theology, ministry, ethics, and history, offering a Continuing Education & Enrichment program as well as a Master of Theology degree—"the only graduate theology program in the western hemisphere taught from a black Catholic perspective". It is currently headed by Dr. Kathleen Dorsey Bellow.

Xavier Exponential 
Established in 2018, Xavier Exponential is the university's holistically selective honors program for high-achieving undergraduate students.  Students admitted to the program have access to special funding and learning opportunities.

Special programs

Center for Equity, Justice, and the Human Spirit 
In 2018, David Robinson-Morris founded the university's Center for Equity, Justice, and the Human Spirit (CEJHS), a social justice hub and a space for scholarly research and community-driven systems change.

The first of its kind at an HBCU, the center's focus is to shift oppressive policies and practices in education, criminal justice, and environmental sustainability. The Center aims to honor the faith and principles of XULA's foundress, St. Katharine, and benefits from a planning grant from the W. K. Kellogg Foundation.
  
Robinson-Morris departed the university in December 2020, saying that he was overworked, undervalued, and that his concerns about the university's administrative issues were not being fully heard and addressed. Cirecie Olatunji was appointed the new director in 2022.

Campus life

S.B.S. Sisters
The Sisters of the Blessed Sacrament remain a presence on campus, providing much-needed staffing and some financial assistance, but today Xavier is governed by a Board of Trustees.

Student organizations

 Student Government Association
 Homecoming Committee
 Student Advisory Board
 Student Life Council
 Pharmacy Student Association
 Residence Hall Association
 Commuter/Off-Campus Student Network

 Academic/departmental clubs
 Honor societies
 Professional Greek organizations
 NPHC Greek organizations
 Special interest organizations
 Intercollegiate athletics
 Performing groups

Athletics

The Xavier athletics teams are called the Gold Rush and Gold Nuggets. The university is a member of the National Association of Intercollegiate Athletics (NAIA), primarily competing in the Red River Athletic Conference (RRAC) since the 2021–22 academic year. The Gold Rush and Gold Nuggets previously competed in the Gulf Coast Athletic Conference (GCAC) from 1981–82 to 2020–21.

XULA competes in 12 intercollegiate varsity sports: Men's sports include baseball, basketball, cross country, tennis and track & field; women's sports include basketball, cross country, softball, tennis, track & field, and volleyball; and co-ed sports include competitive cheer. Former sports included football.

Facilities
Xavier's basketball and volleyball teams compete on campus in the Xavier University Academic Convocation Center. The Convocation Center is a $25 million facility with a seating capacity of 4,500.

Media

Xavier Herald 
The Xavier Herald, the university's student newspaper, has served as an outlet of the student voice, especially during the Civil Rights Movement and thereafter. The Herald was first published in 1925, coinciding with the first year that Xavier University of Louisiana began offering college-level courses. The original title of the newspaper was La Cigale, which means grasshopper, or cicada, in French. The title was changed in 1928 to The Xavier Herald, to identify the paper more with the university. The newspaper has been published continuously since, with issues scheduled monthly during the Fall and Spring semesters, but with less regular issues during the summer. It was instrumental in the fight for more Black faculty—the university remains one of the few HBCUs with more White faculty than Black—and for the hiring of Dr. Francis as the university's first lay president, as most of the previous presidents were from the Sisters of the Blessed Sacrament, who—despite serving minority communities—are largely White.

Other media 
The university currently houses a student radio station, YouTube channel, and a podcast.

Campus

Construction
Through the years, as needs dictated, the campus gradually expanded: 
Xavier Stadium (Land Purchased June 1929; Opened September 28, 1930)
Administration Building (Construction Began in 1931; Dedicated October 12, 1932; Opened Fall 1933)
Old Library, now Music Department Building (Dedicated October 12, 1937)
Gymnasium, referred to as "The Barn" (Dedicated November 2, 1937)
Saint Thomas Aquinas Hall Men's Dormitory (1940s)
Saint Michael's Hall Men's Dormitory (First Open House, October 12, 1955)
Old Student Center (Opened and Dedicated December 2, 1962)
Saint Joseph's Hall Women's Dormitory (1965)
House of Studies (1967)
Saint Katharine Drexel Hall Women's Dormitory (Dedicated April 20,1969)
College of Pharmacy (Dedicated April 5, 1970)
Norman C. Francis Academic/Science Complex (1988)
Xavier South Office Building (1990)
Library Resource Center and College of Pharmacy Addition (1993)
Peter Claver Women's Dormitory (1994)
Norman C. Francis Science Complex Addition (1998)
The Living Learning Center Upperclassmen Coed Residence (1998)
University Student Center (2003)
St. Martin de Porres Upperclassmen Residence (2003)
Qatar Pharmacy Pavilion (2010)
Convocation Academic Center (2012)
Saint Katharine Drexel Chapel (2012)
Fitness Center (2015)

The campus of Xavier University of Louisiana is often referred to as "Emerald City" due to the various buildings on campus that have green roofs. These include the Library/Resource center, the Norman C. Francis science addition, the University Center, the Living Learning Center, the Saint Martin De Porres hall and the Katharine Drexel hall.

Notable alumni
In addition to former president, Norman C. Francis, distinguished alumni include:

Notable faculty and staff 
Arthur P. Bedou - Visiting Photographer; African-American photographer noted for being the personal photographer of Booker T. Washington. 
Regina Benjamin - MD, MBA, 18th Surgeon General of the United States.
Edward S. Bopp - Xavier Adjunct Professor of Pharmacy; New Orleans lawyer, and state representative from 1977 to 1984
Dr. Joyce Hooper Corrington - Xavier Director of Research in Science and Associate Professor of Chemistry; American television and film writer including Battle for the Planet of the Apes (1973), General Hospital, and One Life to Live, and the television film The Killer Bees (1974).
Dr. Norman C. Francis - Xavier President from 1968 to 2015; Previously served as Dean of Men, Director of Student Personnel Services, Assistant to the President for Student Affairs, Assistant to the President in Charge of Development, and Executive Vice-President prior to his presidential appointment.
Dr. Antoine Garibaldi - Xavier Professor and Chair of the Education Department, Dean of Arts and Sciences, and Vice President for Academic Affairs; first lay and first African-American President at University of Detroit Mercy's, and sixth and first African-American President of Gannon University. 
Frank Hercules - Xavier Visiting Professor and Writer-in-Residence, English Dept.; author of "Where the Hummingbird Flies" (1961), "I Want a Black Doll" (1967), and "American Society and the Black Revolution" (1972).  
Bob Hopkins - Xavier Basketball Coach (1969–74); NBA Player for the Syracuse Nationals and Philadelphia Tapers; NBA Coach for the Seattle SuperSonics (1974–77) and New York Knicks (1978-79).  
Harold Hunter - Xavier Basketball Coach (1974–77); first African American to sign a contract with any National Basketball Association (NBA) team.  
Father Jerome LeDoux, S.V.D. - Xavier University Chaplin, Professor of Philosophy and Theology; African-American priest and author noted for his Afrocentric Catholic Masses, his ebullient style, and his writings.
Ralph Metcalfe - Xavier Professor of Political Science and Track Coach; African-American track and field sprinter, 4-time Olympic medal recipient, and was regarded as the world's fastest human in 1934 and 1935
Sister Mary Elise Sisson - Chairwoman of Xavier Music Department; founded Opera-South in Jackson, MS (encompassing Jackson State University, Utica State College, and Tougaloo College), and founded the National Opera Ebony in New York and Philadelphia.
Pearl L. Stewart - Xavier Journalist-in-Residence; editor of the Oakland Tribune in 1992, the first African-American woman editor of a major metropolitan daily newspaper.
Dr. Michael White - Xavier Professor of Spanish and African-American Music; world-famous Jazz clarinetist, bandleader, composer, jazz historian and musical educator.
James Yestadt - Xavier Professor of Music; world-famous symphony conductor, previous resident conductor of the New Orleans Symphony Orchestra, Baton Rouge Orchestra, Louisiana Youth Orchestra, Mobile Symphony Orchestra, West Valley Symphony, and Zurich Radio Orchestra.

See also
 Gert Town
 St. Katharine Drexel

References

Further reading
  - By a contributing writer

External links

 
 Official athletics website
 Official student media website

 
Educational institutions established in 1925
Universities and colleges accredited by the Southern Association of Colleges and Schools
Association of Catholic Colleges and Universities
Liberal arts colleges in Louisiana
Historically black schools
Universities established in the 20th century
Universities established in the 1920s
Catholic universities and colleges
Catholic universities and colleges in North America
Catholic universities and colleges in Louisiana
Catholic universities and colleges in the United States
Christian universities and colleges
Christian universities and colleges in the United States
African-American Christianity
African-American Roman Catholicism
African-American Roman Catholic schools
Historically black Christian universities and colleges
National Register of Historic Places in New Orleans
Schools founded by St. Katharine Drexel
Sisters of the Blessed Sacrament
African-American Catholic colleges and universities